Cayetano Ordóñez y Aguilera (January 24, 1904, Ronda, Spain - October 30, 1961, Madrid, Spain) is the patriarch of the Ordóñez family of bullfighters.

His parents owned a shoeshop called La Palma, which gave him his nickname (Niño de la Palma).  In 1917 he first began to perform as a bullfighter in the ranches of the area where he lived.  In 1923 he had his debut in Ronda, where he became the first bullfighter to be carried in triumph through the main gates of the Maestranza, and in 1924 he caused great commotion again when the same thing happened in Seville. From that point on he was greatly in demand by all the professional and amateur rings in Spain. He was used by Ernest Hemingway as the model for "Pedro Romero", the talented young bullfighter in The Sun Also Rises.  Hemingway later stated that "everything that happened in the ring was true, and everything outside was fiction.  Nino knew this and never complained about it."

His last bullfight was at Aranda de Duero in 1942. He was the director of the Lisbon School of Bullfighting and died in Madrid on 30 October 1961.  

His sons mainly became bullfighters, Antonio Ordóñez becoming one of the most important in post-Civil War Spain and subject of Hemingway's book The Dangerous Summer. His great grandsons, Francisco and Cayetano Rivera Ordóñez are famous matadors still working in Spain today.

See also
List of bullfighters
Plaza de Toros de Ronda

External links
Portal Taurino information

1904 births
1961 deaths
People from Ronda
Sportspeople from the Province of Málaga
Spanish bullfighters